Henry Boguet  (1550 in Pierrecourt, Haute-Saône – 1619) was a well known jurist and judge of Saint-Claude (1596–1616) in the County of Burgundy. His renown is to a large degree based on his fame as a demonologist for his Discours exécrable des Sorciers (1602) which was reprinted twelve times in twenty years.

1550 births
1619 deaths
17th-century French judges
Witchcraft in France
Demonologists
People from Haute-Saône
16th-century French judges